Kosmos 959 ( meaning Cosmos 959) was a satellite which was used as a target for tests of anti-satellite weapons. It was launched by the Soviet Union in 1977 as part of the Dnepropetrovsk Sputnik programme, and used as a target for Kosmos 961, as part of the Istrebitel Sputnikov programme.

It was launched aboard a Kosmos-3M carrier rocket, from Site 132/1 at the Plesetsk Cosmodrome. The launch occurred at 10:05 UTC on 21 October 1977.

It was successfully intercepted by Kosmos 961, as part of a non-destructive test. Following this, it decayed from orbit on 30 November 1977.

Kosmos 959 was the sixth of ten Lira satellites to be launched, of which all but the first were successful. Lira was derived from the earlier DS-P1-M satellite, which it replaced.

See also

1977 in spaceflight

References

1977 in spaceflight
Satellites formerly orbiting Earth
Kosmos satellites
Spacecraft launched in 1977
Dnepropetrovsk Sputnik program